Martin Schroyens (16 February 1930 – 26 November 2011) was a Belgian footballer. He played in three matches for the Belgium national football team in 1952.

References

External links
 

1930 births
2011 deaths
Belgian footballers
Belgium international footballers
Place of birth missing
Association football defenders